No Man Left Behind is an American television series which aired on the National Geographic Channel. The series tells the stories of American military encounters using archival footage, reenactments and testimony from those who were involved.

Episodes

Season 1

References

External links

National Geographic (American TV channel) original programming
2016 American television series debuts
2016 American television series endings
American military television series